Petty officer first class (PO1) is a rank found in some navies and maritime organizations.

Canada
Petty officer, 1st class,  PO1, is a Naval non-commissioned member rank of the Canadian Forces. It is senior to the rank of petty officer 2nd-class and its equivalents, and junior to chief petty officer 2nd-class and its equivalents. Its Army and Air Force equivalent is warrant officer (WO).

The French form of the rank is maître de 1re classe.  	 

The rank insignia of the PO1 is a crown worn on both forearms of the Service Dress tunic, and on slip-ons on both shoulders of other uniforms. PO1s are generally initially addressed as "Petty Officer Bloggins" or "PO Bloggins", and thereafter as "PO", although in correspondence the full rank or abbreviation is used before the member's name. The full appellation "Petty Officer 1st-Class" or "PO1" in speech is generally used only when the "first-class" distinction be made, such as to distinguish between members with similar names but differing ranks, or on promotion parades.

United States

It is the sixth enlisted rate in the United States Navy and the U.S. Coast Guard, ranking just above petty officer second class and directly below chief petty officer. It is designated as non-commissioned officer, as are all petty officer ratings. It is equivalent to the rank of staff sergeant in the Army and Marine Corps, and technical sergeant in the Air Force. 
They are all ranked E-6, which refers to the enlisted numbering system associated with pay grades.

Overview
In the United States Navy, each rating is officially abbreviated, such as ET for Electronics Technician, STS for Sonar Technician Submarines, or FT for Fire Control Technician.  It is common practice to refer to the Petty Officer by this shorthand in all but the most formal correspondence (such as printing and inscription on awards).  Often, the Petty Officer is just referred to by the shorthand designation, without using the surname.  Thus ET1 Jones would just be called "ET1".  A First Class Petty Officer may be generically referred to as PO1 when the sailor's rating is not known, although some prefer to be called simply "Petty Officer (last name)".  To address a Petty Officer, one would say, "Petty Officer Smith", "Smith", or "Sailor" (the latter two forms being acceptable for use by those equal or greater in rank than the Petty Officer).  It is uncommon to address a Petty Officer as simply, "Petty Officer" the way one might address an NCO in the Army as "Sergeant".  Also acceptable, but archaic, would be to address a Petty Officer or Chief Petty Officer of any grade as "Mister Smith" or "Ms. Smith".  The use of "Ms." or "Mister" is commonly only in reference to junior commissioned officers or warrant officers.

Similar to Petty Officer Second Class and Third Class, advancement to Petty Officer First Class is contingent upon the following conditions:

Completed a period of time-in-rate (three years time-in-rate as a second-class petty officer, or two years if the second-class petty officer received a promotion recommendation of "early promote" (EP) on their latest periodic performance evaluation and the second-class petty officer's commanding officer authorizes a one-year time-in-rate waiver).
Recommended for advancement by the commanding officer.
Have an established performance mark average.
No pending request for voluntary transfer to the fleet reserve.

The advancement cycle is currently every 6 months (March and September). Only second-class petty officers that achieve a passing score on the biannual advancement examination are eligible to be advanced to first-class petty officer. Once the examination is complete, a quota is established based upon the needs of the Navy with respect to the specific rating the sailor holds. Using the rating ET (electronics technician) as an example:

1,000 ET2 (electronics technician, second class) eligible to be advanced after passing the advancement examination
100 are allowed to be advanced to ET1 (electronics technician, first class) by the Navy (a 10% quota)
The 100th eligible ET2 received a 219.5 final multiple score, therefore 219.5 is the lowest possible final multiple allowed to advance to ET1.

The Navy's current high year tenure policy imposes a maximum enlistment of 22 years (total active service) to a petty officer first class. If a petty officer first class is not selected to the paygrade of chief petty officer within those 22 years, the petty officer is honorably retired from active service in the United States Navy, and placed in Fleet Reserve (inactive service) for a period of 8 to 10 years.  Should there be no recall of the sailor to active duty due to war or national emergency, the sailor will then transition to a "retired" status after a combined total of 30 years of service.

The rate insignia for a petty officer, first class is a perched eagle above three chevrons.  On more formal uniforms (dress white and dress blue uniform), the symbol for the petty officer's rating will be placed between the eagle and the chevrons.  On white uniforms, the eagle, rating, and chevrons are dark blue (almost black- this has led to the eagle being referred to as the "crow" in common practice, and often the entire rating badge is simply referred to as the crow).  On navy blue (black) uniforms, the eagle and rating are white, and the chevrons are red, unless the sailor has served in the Navy for at least 12 consecutive years, with good conduct, then that sailor wears gold chevrons on the dress blue uniform. Gold chevrons are also worn on the collars of the Navy blue coveralls uniform, and on the black garrison cap (only) worn with the Navy service working uniform (often called "peanut butters" or "black and tans"). The Coast Guard does not use golden chevrons. Working uniforms (all variations of the camouflage uniform) and metal rank devices do not have the rating badge symbol.

First class petty officers normally serve as leading petty officers of a division, and direct the activities of a division.  There are situations when there are more than one first class petty officers in a division, due to the demands for highly experienced or skilled Sailors in technical areas.  Leading petty officer experience for a first-class petty officer is not officially required for advancement to chief petty officer (E7); however, it is generally accepted that at least one documented tour as an LPO (preferably at sea) is a vital step for advancement.

First-class petty officers often form associations at their commands. Memberships in these associations are voluntary. On larger ships and some shore commands, PO1s may have their own mess, although unlike the CPO mess and wardroom mess, which have their own galleys and cooks, the first class "mess" is merely a separate compartment for eating meals from the general crew mess.

Petty officers (E4-E6) serve a dual role as both technical experts and as leaders.  Unlike the sailors below them, there is no such thing as an "undesignated petty officer."  Every petty officer has both a rate (rank) and rating (job, similar to a Military Occupation Specialty (MOS) in other services).  A petty officer's full title is a combination of the two.  Thus, a petty officer, first class, who has the rating of electronics technician would properly be called an Electronics Technician First Class, or ET1.  The term "petty officer" is typically only used in the general sense when referring to a group of petty officers of different ratings, when the petty officer's rating is unknown, or when someone who is E-3 or below addresses a petty officer while in basic training or "A" school.

Insignia

See also
 Petty officer
 U.S. Navy enlisted rate insignia
 Comparative military ranks

References

Petty Officer 1
Military ranks of the United States Coast Guard
United States military enlisted ranks